Locked in or lock in may refer to:

Arts and entertainment
 Locked In (album), a 1976 album by Wishbone Ash
 "Locked In" (House), an episode of the TV series
 "Locked In", a 1986 song by Judas Priest from the album Turbo Lover
 Locked In (film), a 2010 thriller drama
 Lock In, a 2014 novel by John Scalzi

Other uses
 Lock-in (pub), when a pub owner allows patrons to stay past closing time
 Locked-in syndrome, a medical condition 
 Locked in period, in stock trading
 Lock-in, a driver in path dependence
 Lock-in, a variant of a lockout in industrial disputes
 Lock-in, a type of sleepover party

See also

 Lockdown (disambiguation)
 Lockin (disambiguation)
 Lock-on (disambiguation)
 Lock-in amplifier, a type of amplifier
 Vendor lock-in, in economics